Nele Hertling née Schröder (born 23 February 1934) is a German theatre manager and promoter of innovative culture. Working for the Academy of Arts, Berlin, from 1962, she has founded regular programs of innovative art in the city, such as Pantomime-Musik-Tanz-Theater in 1970 and the Tanz im August festival in 1988. She managed the program for Berlin as the European City of Culture that year. Hertling is considered the grande dame of the established German  (free theatre).

Life and work 
Hertling was born in Berlin. She grew up in a family of musicians, and was early exposed to the performing arts and contemporary culture. After studying German studies and theatre studies at the Faculty of Philosophy of Humboldt University Berlin, which she completed in 1957, she worked freelance for radio and theatre. She lived in London for one year with her husband, . She worked for the Academy of Arts, Berlin, from 1962, as a research assistant in the departments of music and performing arts. There, she brought innovative art forms to Berlin.

From 1974, she also worked as a senate secretary. In 1987, she took over the management of the Werkstatt Berlin to develop the program for Berlin as the European City of Culture in 1988. From 1989 to 2003, she was artistic director of the Hebbel Theatre.

From the summer of 2003 until the end of 2006, Hertling was director of the DAAD Artists-in-Berlin Program. She is a co-founder of the initiative "" and a member of its strategy group. Since 2006 she has been vice-president of the Academy of Arts, Berlin.

Work 
Hertling initiated several programs of innovative culture. From 1970, she created programs and series of events in Berlin, including Pantomime-Musik-Tanz-Theater (PMTT), with Dirk Scheper, for pantomime, music, dance and theatre. From 1972, several art didactic programs were added. In 1988, she founded a festival Tanz im August, which was named Internationales Tanzfest Berlin – Tanz im August from 1999 to 2003.

Awards and prizes 
 1978: Deutscher Kritikerpreis for dance, together with Dirk Scheper
 1993: Knight of the Ordre des Arts et des Lettres
 1995: Order of Merit of Berlin
 1999: Order of Merit of the Federal Republic of Germany
 2001: Knight of the Legion of Honour
 2004: Caroline Neuber Prize of the city of Leipzig
 2004: ITI-Preis zum Welttheatertag of the International Theatre Institute
 2013: Officer's Cross of the Order of Merit of the Federal Republic of Germany
 2014: 
 2014: Officer of the Ordre des Arts et des Lettres
 2018: Deutscher Tanzpreis

References

Further reading 
 Leonie See, Ania Wilder-Mintzer (ed.): Ich weiss, was ich will: Frauen, Kultur, Management. Orlanda Frauenverlag, 1991, pp. 50 f. (with biography)
 

Women theatre directors
Officers Crosses of the Order of Merit of the Federal Republic of Germany
Recipients of the Order of Merit of Berlin
Officiers of the Ordre des Arts et des Lettres
Chevaliers of the Légion d'honneur
Members of the Academy of Arts, Berlin
1934 births
Living people
People from Berlin